Zuidhorn is a town and former municipality in the northeastern Netherlands. The town largely depends on the city of Groningen. A railway line, operated by Arriva, connects the town with Leeuwarden in Friesland and Groningen.

Due to a municipal reorganisation in 1990, Zuidhorn municipality was extended when it merged with, though not physically connected to Oldehove, Grijpskerk and Aduard. On 1 January 2019, the municipality was dissolved and merged into the municipality of Westerkwartier.

Transport 
Zuidhorn has two train stations: Zuidhorn and Grijpskerk. At least once an hour a train runs between Groningen and Leeuwarden. On weekdays, trains stop twice an hour in Zuidhorn. Until 1991 there used to be a third station on this line, Visvliet.

Nature 
In the center of Zuidhorn, lies a large, partly wooded park called "Johan Smit Park". It offers a wide variety of recreation, open to the public, based on trails. The "Quick Silver S" is the main sport hall, hosting many activities such as a running clubs, and other sports. Nearby, the park has numerous football fields and a playground. For most of the year, docile highland cattle roam the park.

Wierden 
There is a dense concentration of terps, better known as wierden, artificial dwelling hills, in the area Middag-Humsterland. In 1995, this collection of wierden was submitted to UNESCO's list of World Heritage Sites. The property is currently on the tentative list.

Population centres 

Aalsum, Aduard, Balmahuizen, Barnwerd, Briltil, De Kampen, De Poffert, De Ruigewaard, Den Ham, Den Horn, Diepswal, Electra, Englum, Fransum, Frytum, Gaaikemadijk, Gaaikemaweer, Gaarkeuken, Grijpskerk, Heereburen, Hoekje, Hoogemeeden, Humsterland, Ikum, Kenwerd, Kommerzijl, Korhorn, Lagemeeden, Lammerburen, Lauwerzijl, Niehove, Nieuwklap, Niezijl, Noorderburen, Noordhorn, Noordhornerga, Noordhornertolhek, Okswerd, Oldehove, Pama, Pieterzijl, Ruigezand, Saaksum, Selwerd, Spanjaardsdijk, Steentil, Visvliet, Wierumerschouw and Zuidhorn.

Notable people 
 John William, Baron Ripperda (1684–1737) political adventurer and Spanish Prime Minister 
 Marten Douwes Teenstra (1795-1864) writer and traveller in South Africa and the Dutch East Indies
 Albert Egges van Giffen (1884–1973) archaeologist, specialised in hunebeds and tumuli 
 Jan Wiegers (1893-1959) expressionist painter
 Roelof Kruisinga (1922–2012) politician and physician
 Bert Groen (born 1945) corporate director, former civil servant and politician
 Paul Blokhuis (born 1963) politician

Sport 
 Matthijs Vellenga (born 1977) rower, medallist at the 2004 Summer Olympics
 David Kuiper (born 1980) rower
 Hieke Zijlstra (born 1981) footballer

References

External links

Official website

Westerkwartier
Westerkwartier (municipality)
Former municipalities of Groningen (province)
Populated places in Groningen (province)
Municipalities of the Netherlands disestablished in 2019

fy:Súdhorn (plak)